Frank Hanna (5 April 1924 – 28 November 2010) was a former Australian rules footballer who played with Melbourne in the Victorian Football League (VFL).

In 1948 he was badly injured when Jack Dyer strongly bumped him, breaking his collarbone and suffering a concussion.  He was carried from the ground on the stretcher and Dyer played the remainder of the game thinking he had killed Hanna.

In 1949 he coached the Horsham Football Club before moving to Tasmania in 1950 to coach Yeoman Football Club and then Burnie Football Club from 1951.

Notes

External links 

		
Frank Hanna's profile at Demonwiki

Australian rules footballers from Victoria (Australia)
Melbourne Football Club players
Horsham Football Club players
Burnie Football Club players
1924 births
2010 deaths